Leitrim County Council is the authority responsible for local government in County Leitrim, Ireland. As a county council, it is governed by the Local Government Act 2001. The council is responsible for housing and community, roads and transportation, urban planning and development, amenity and culture, and environment. The council has 18 elected members. Elections are held every five years and are by single transferable vote. The head of the council has the title of Cathaoirleach (Chairperson). The county administration is headed by a Chief Executive, Lar Power. The county town is Carrick-on-Shannon.

History
The county council, which had originally been based in the Carrick-on-Shannon Courthouse, moved to County Hall in 1994. In 2016, after the results of the Brexit referendum, the council backed a motion in which it was proposed that the Irish government would put pressure on the British government to facilitate a referendum on a united Ireland within 12 months.

Local Electoral Areas and Municipal Districts
Leitrim County Council is divided into the following local electoral areas and municipal districts, defined by electoral divisions.

Councillors

2019 seats summary

Councillors by electoral area
This list reflects the order in which councillors were elected on 24 May 2019 at the 2019 Leitrim County Council election.

 

Notes

References

External links

Politics of County Leitrim
County councils in the Republic of Ireland